Erigeron greenei is a North American species of flowering plant in the family Asteraceae known by the common name Greene's narrow-leaved daisy .

Erigeron greenei is an uncommon species with a restricted range. It has been found only in California in the region north of San Francisco Bay, from Sonoma and Napa Counties north as far as Siskiyou County.

Erigeron greenei is a perennial herb up to 90 cm (3 feet) tall, producing a large taproot. Leaves are narrow, up to 60 mm (2.4 inches) long but less than 2 mm (0.08 inches) across. The plant sometimes produces only one flower heads per stem, sometimes groups of as many as 5. Each head contains as many as numerous yellow disc florets but no ray florets. The species grows in open coniferous woodlands, frequently in serpentine soil.

References

External links

greenei
Flora of California
Plants described in 1884
Flora without expected TNC conservation status